Pasquines is a policy and politics non-profit news organization that covers news related to politics, government, design and economy in United States territories. The organization has its base of operations in Mayaguez, PR and Washington, DC. It was founded by William-Jose Velez Gonzalez who serves as Editor in chief. Its slogan 'context of islands' first appeared in June 2018, on the fifth anniversary of the organization's founding.

Name
The organization is "named after the custom in Puerto Rico of placing repetitive political flyers in public places."

History
Pasquines started out as a politics blog dedicated to covering "all the politics," focusing on local and federal political stories affecting Puerto Rico. Its name derives from the custom in Puerto Rico of placing political flyers in public spaces, often plastering copies of the same flyer until entire walls are covered, which is known locally in Spanish as a "pasquinada." On April 6, 2015, Pasquines launched its internship program, aiming at providing a training and education experience for students in the United States, while expanding its reach.

On December 12, 2016, Pasquines officially registered with the Department of State of Puerto Rico as a non-stock corporation, under register no. 387545, becoming a nonprofit organization. It has filed one annual report to date, reporting an operating budget of $0.

Since then, the organization has expanded its focus, now covering news about politics, public policy, economy, technology, design, and innovation. On its website, it lists a volunteer staff of 12, not including contributors and intern writers.

In June 2018, Pasquines celebrated 5 years since it began publishing online. As part of its anniversary campaign it unveiled the "context of islands" slogan.

Polling
Starting on March 21, 2016, Pasquines began conducting polls on Puerto Rico elections. Their data has been used by websites like Daily Kos and FiveThirtyEight.

Recognition and awards
 In June 2016, FiveThirtyEight writer Harry Enten recognized Pasquines' polling in Puerto Rico, saying "In a year in which pollsters have struggled on the Democratic side, @pasquines_US looks like it has done very well in Puerto Rico."

Notes

References

External links
 Official site

Newspapers established in 2013
Mass media in Miami
Newspapers published in Puerto Rico
English-language newspapers published in North America